Madim may refer to:
 Madim-e Olya